Ephestris is a monotypic tiger moth genus in the family Erebidae. It contains the single species Ephestris melaxantha. Both the genus and species were first described by Jacob Hübner, the genus in 1820 and the species in 1809.

Etymology
The specific name melaxantha derives from the Greek μελανός (melanós) meaning "black" and xanthus, meaning "golden haired" or "yellow", with reference to the striking coloration of the wings, probably a warning to predators.

Description
Despite being a moth, it has diurnal behavior.

Distribution
This species is native to Brazil and the tropical regions of South America.

References

External links

 Insecta-web

Pericopina
Monotypic moth genera
Moths of South America